Richard Alan Reid (born 29 September 1984 in London, England) is a film and television producer, writer and actor. He currently serves as Head of BuzzFeed Studios  and Senior Vice President of Global Content at BuzzFeed.

Reid attended the Reading Blue Coat School and the Redroofs Theatre School in Berkshire.  He later became a member of The National Youth Theatre in London  and graduated from University of California, Santa Barbara.

Career 

Reid's credits include Love, Wedding, Marriage, William & Kate: The Movie, Frat Pack, Tulip Fever with Christoph Waltz, Criminal with Kevin Costner, Sony Pictures' Austenland, which was part of the 2013 Sundance Film Festival, The Legend of Hercules., There's Always Woodstock, The Brits Are Coming with Uma Thurman, Battle Drone, NCIS (2012 episode "The Good Son"), and The Weinstein Company's Woman in Gold with Helen Mirren and Ryan Reynolds.

His production credits include Sky TV's America's Elite, the Renny Harlin-directed horror film Devil's Pass, Frat Pack, Love, Wedding, Marriage, Worth It: UK, Accidental Love with Jake Gyllenhaal and Jessica Biel, 1UP, with Ruby Rose for Lionsgate, Book of Love, with Sam Claflin and Veronica Echegui, Fear of Rain as well as The End of Us and Recovery, both of which premiered at the 2021 South By Southwest Film Festival.

Reid served as Vice President of Film & TV at K.Jam Media (Lucky Number Slevin, Sin City: A Dame to Kill For, Lord of War) and Executive Vice President, Development at 'Sunrise Films.' (Father of Invention, The Whistleblower). He is currently Head of BuzzFeed Studios, which produces original content across broadcast, cable, SVOD, film and digital platforms, and Senior Vice President of Global Content for BuzzFeed. He has led many thought leadership keynotes on the subjects of Creativity and content creation in the digital age. He has creative directed advertising campaigns for brands including GEICO, Coca-Cola, BMW, Citibank, and Amazon.

Reid is represented by Creative Artists Agency.

References

External links
 
 

1984 births
Living people
Male actors from London
21st-century English male actors
National Youth Theatre members